Kunthi Puthra is a 1994 Indian Kannada-language film, directed and produced by Vijay. Cinematography by T. Surendra Reddy. The film stars Vishnuvardhan, Shashikumar, Sonakshi and Rajanand in lead roles. This was the debut movie of actress  Sonakshi. The film had musical score by Vijayanand.

Plot
Surya is a Gangster works for Gang Leader. Surya is very obedient for his Master. One day his Master gave him task to save a girl named Mala from Brothel.

Cast

Vishnuvardhan as Surya / Ravi
Shashikumar as Chandru
Sonakshi as Mala
Rajanand 
Mukhyamantri Chandru
Sudheer
Ramesh Bhat
M. S. Umesh
Pandari Bai
Rekha Prakash
Kalashree
Rathnakar
Dingri Nagaraj
Sihikahi Chandru
B. K. Shankar
Mandeep Roy
M. S. Karanth
Chikkanna
Srishailan
Ramanand
Master Anand

Music
"Amma Yennalu" - S. P. Balasubrahmanyam
"Dinga Danga Dinga" - Manjula Gururaj
"Ee Prema" - S. P. Balasubrahmanyam, K. S. Chithra
"Ee Prema Patho" - S. P. Balasubrahmanyam, K. S. Chithra
"Nammura Siridevi" - S. P. Balasubrahmanyam, K. S. Chithra
"Pappi Kode" - S. P. Balasubrahmanyam, K. S. Chithra

References

External links
 

1990s Kannada-language films
1990 films
Films scored by Vijayanand